Elections to the Manipur Legislative Assembly were held in February 2002, to elect members of the 60 constituencies in Manipur, India. The Indian National Congress won the most seats as well as the popular vote, and Okram Ibobi Singh was appointed as the Chief Minister of Manipur. The Indian National Congress didn't have a majority of seats on its own and joined the Secular Proggresive Front alliance, along with the Communist Party of India, the Nationalist Congress Party and the Manipur State Congress Party.

After the passing of The Delimitation of Parliamentary and Assembly Constituencies Order, 1976, the constituencies were set to the ones used in this election.

Results

Elected Members

See also 
 List of constituencies of the Manipur Legislative Assembly
 2002 elections in India

References

Manipur
State Assembly elections in Manipur
2000s in Manipur